The Doris Day Animal League was an animal advocacy group based in Washington, D.C. It established the annual observance Spay Day USA in 1994, which the group uses to bring attention to the pet overpopulation problem in the United States. On September 1, 2006, the organization merged with the Humane Society of the United States.

References

External links
 Official website
 Guide to the Doris Day Animal League Records 1978-2006

Animal welfare organizations based in the United States
Doris Day
1994 establishments in Washington, D.C.

Non-profit organizations based in Washington, D.C.